Minlag or Mineralny Camp Directorate  (Минлаг, Минеральный лагерь, Особый лагерь № 1 (Special Camp no. 1), Особлаг № 1) was an MVD special camp for political prisoners within the Gulag system of the Soviet Union. It was established on February 28, 1948 based on the Inta labor camp (Inta ITL), Komi ASSR. In 1954, after Stalin's death it was reorganized into an ordinary Mineralny Corrective Labor Camp (Минеральный ИТЛ, Mineralny ITL).

References

MVD special camps